Neferkare or Nefkara may refer to:

Pharaohs
 Neferkara I, 2nd Dynasty
 Pepi II Neferkare, 6th Dynasty
 Neferkare II, 8th Dynasty
 Neferkare Neby, 8th Dynasty
 Neferkare Khendu, 8th Dynasty
 Neferkare Tereru, 8th Dynasty
 Neferkare Pepiseneb, 8th Dynasty
 Neferkare, 9th Dynasty
 Neferkare VIII, 10th Dynasty
 Neferkare Nebiriau II, 16th Dynasty
 Neferkare Setepenre Ramesses IX, 20th Dynasty
 Neferkare Amenemnisu, 21st Dynasty
 Neferkare Peftjauawybast, king of Herakleopolis Magna during the 25th Dynasty
 Neferkare Shabaka, 25th Dynasty
 Neferkare (Tanis), king of Tanis during the 26th Dynasty

Other people
 Neferka, eldest son and heir of Pepi II Neferkare
 Neferkare Iymeru, vizier during the 13th Dynasty

Ancient Egyptian given names
Theophoric names